Camp Sullivan can refer to:
Camp Sullivan (Indiana), located on the grounds of Military Park
Camp Sullivan (Alaska), located in Whittier, Alaska